Rainbow Street Public School is a comprehensive public school located in Randwick, New South Wales, Australia operated by the New South Wales Department of Education and Training.
The school has 419 students and 34 staff, and is in close proximity to the University of NSW, Prince of Wales Hospital and the Randwick Army Barracks. The school has a close liaison with Randwick Boys and Girls High Schools, as well as Rainbow Street Childcare Centre.

Award-winning actor Russell Crowe attended the school.

In 2011, the principal was forced to resign after parents moved a motion of "no-confidence" in her, something criticised as potentially creating a "precedent" by unions.

In 2014, the state government announced plans to expand the school.

References

1924 establishments in Australia
Educational institutions established in 1924
Randwick, New South Wales
Public primary schools in Sydney